The Austrian Bridge Federation is the national organization charged with regulating and promoting the card game of bridge in Austria. Its headquarters are in Vienna, and there are four regional federations (Landesverbände) and 43 clubs. In 2020, it had about 2,600 members. The current president is Helmuth Ölsinger.

During the years preceding World War II, Austria was one of the strongest bridge nations, winning the European Open Team Championship in 1932, 1933 and 1936 and the European Women's Team Championship in 1935 and 1936. Achievements after World War II includes Winning of the World Pairs Championship 1970, European Junior Team Championship 1976, European Women's Team Championship 1991, European Junior Pairs Championship 1999 and 2001. It is one of the oldest bridge federations in the world.

Executive board

Presidents
 President: Helmuth Ölsinger
 Vice-president: Doris Fischer

Members
 Michael Kalchbauer
 Klaus Köpplinger
 Klaus Schilhan
 Margit Schwarz
 Angelika Stalzer
 Michael Strafner

History
The federation was founded in 1929 by Paul Stern (1892–1948), who was also its first president.

See also
Austria
World Bridge Federation
List of bridge federations
Austrian bridge players

References

External links
 

Organisations based in Vienna
Contract bridge governing bodies
Bridge
Contract bridge in Austria
1929 establishments in Austria
Sports organizations established in 1929